The , formerly known as Interchange Association, is an organization that represents the interests of Japan in Taiwan. In 2017, the current name was adopted.

Its counterpart in Japan is the Taipei Economic and Cultural Representative Office in Japan, formerly the office of the Association of East Asian Relations (1972-1992).

It has offices in Tokyo, in Taipei and in Kaohsiung.

The Taipei office, located at 28 Ching Cheng Street, functions as the de facto embassy in Taiwan and houses the Japanese Cultural Center. The Kaohsiung office similarly functions as a de facto consulate-general.

The headquarters in Tokyo works to connect the Ministry of Foreign Affairs and the Taipei office.

History

The establishment of diplomatic relations with the People's Republic of China in 1972 required termination of diplomatic relations with the Republic of China, and abrogation of the Sino-Japanese Peace Treaty.

The Association was established in the same year, and approved by the Ministry of Foreign Affairs and the Ministry of International Trade and Industry of Japan. It operated from the premises of the former Japanese Embassy. Its staff enjoy some diplomatic  privileges as well as limited diplomatic immunity.

The arrangements under which Japan maintained unofficial relations with Taiwan became known as the "Japanese formula". This was adopted by other countries, notably the United States in 1979.

Following the renaming of the Association in 2017, the Ministry of Foreign Affairs of the People's Republic of China expressed its opposition to the new name, urging Japan to "refrain from sending false signals to Taiwan and the international community, thereby causing new problems to China-Japan relations".

See also
 Japan–Taiwan relations

References

External links

  

Japan
Foreign relations of Taiwan
1972 establishments in Japan
1972 establishments in Taiwan
Taipei
Japan–Taiwan relations
Non-profit organizations based in Japan